Inversions higher than the third require extended chords; the fourth inversion requires a ninth chord, the fifth an eleventh chord, etc.

Fourth inversion 

The fourth inversion of a ninth chord is the voicing in which the ninth of the chord is the bass note and the root a minor seventh above it. In the fourth inversion of a G-dominant ninth, the bass is A — the ninth of the chord — with the third, fifth, seventh, and root stacked above it, forming the intervals of a second, a fourth, a sixth, and a seventh above the inverted bass of A, respectively.

Fifth inversion 

The fifth inversion of an eleventh chord is the voicing in which the eleventh of the chord is the bass note and the root a perfect fourth above it. In the fifth inversion of a G-dominant eleventh with eleventh, the bass is C — the eleventh of the chord — with the root, third, fifth, seventh, and ninth stacked above it, forming the intervals of a second, a fourth, a fifth, a sixth, and a seventh above the inverted bass of C, respectively.

Sixth inversion 

The sixth inversion of a thirteenth chord is the highest possible diatonic inversion, since the diatonic scale has seven notes. (The "seventh" inversion of the dominant thirteenth chord is root position.) Higher inversions would require chromaticism and either nonscale tones or scales with more than seven tones.

Arrangement of notes above the bass 

Any voicing above the bass is allowed. For example, a fourth inversion must have the ninth chord factor in the bass, but it may have any arrangement of the root, third, fifth, and seventh above that, including doubled notes, compound intervals, and omission of the fifth (A-G-B-D-F, A-B-D-F-G-B, A-G-D-F, etc.)

See also

Figured bass
Root position
Inversion (music)
First inversion
Second inversion
Third inversion

Notes

References

Chord factors
Chords
Voicing (music)